The Union of Myanmar Federation of Chambers of Commerce and Industry (UMFCCI) is a national level non-governmental organization representing and safeguarding the interests of the private business sector.

Founded in 1919, UMFCCI comprises 16 Regional and State Chambers' of Commerce and Industry, nine Border Trade Associations, 76 Affiliated Associations and about 30,000 members.

UMFCCI acts as a bridge between the State and the private sector presenting the views and interests of business to the Union Government.

UMFCCI supports the business communities by sharing knowledge, expertise and opportunities. Services that the UMFCCI provides include human resource development training, trade information, business facilitation, business matching and consultancy, trade fairs, seminars, workshops, forum and study tours.

External links
 Union of Myanmar Federation of Chambers of Commerce and Industry Official Website
 Myanmar Business Network

Trade associations based in Myanmar
1919 establishments in Burma
Organizations established in 1919
Chambers of commerce